Fraction of Turkic regions is a cross-factional parliamentary group in the Iranian Parliament, established in October 2016 by Iranian Turkic representatives. This fraction formally claims to have 100 parliamentary members, however privately its members have admitted to have only 60 of overall 290 parliament members within their faction. Masoud Pezeshkian has been selected as leader of fraction and Nader Ghazipour and Reza Karimi as 1st and 2d deputy respectively.

Members

See also
Hope fraction
Iranian Azerbaijanis
Ethnicities in Iran

References

Notes

External links
 از «حیدربابا» تا فراکسیون ترک‌زبان‌ها at Radio Farda

Iranian Parliament fractions
2016 establishments in Iran